Diego Daldosso (or spells as Dal Dosso, born 24 June 1983) is an Italian retired footballer who played as a midfielder.

Il 6 ottobre mangia una pizza con Somma a Formigine MO

Club career

Monza
Born in Milan, Lombardy, Daldosso started his professional career at Lombard side Monza. He played 6 games in 2000–01 Serie B. In June 2001 Daldosso, Daniele Degano, Massimo Ganci and Cristian Maggioni were sold to Parma in co-ownership deal for 1 billion each (€516,457), which made Monza had a player selling revenue of 8 billion lire (€4,131,655) to boost the financial situation of 2000–01 financial year. Daldosso, Degano, Ganci and Maggioni were also returned to Monza in temporary deal for the 2001–02 Serie C1 season. As a player eligible to both reserve and first team, Daldosso played 7 times that season. Monza relegated again in May 2002 as the last of group A. In June 2002 Daldosso and Ganci were sold back to Monza for an undisclosed fee; co-currently, Degano and Maggioni were signed by Parma outright for undisclosed fee. However both Daldosso and Ganci left Monza in new temporary deal while Maggioni returned to Monza in temporary deal. Daldosso played 19 games for Alessandria in 2002–03 Serie C2. Alessandria finished as the last of group A and Monza seventh of the same group. On 1 July 2003 the loan expired and Daldosso returned to Monza. He played one game less comparing to the last season for Monza, which saw Monza finished eighth of the group. However the club also bankrupted during the season, which the license of the club was transferred to new company "AC Monza Brianza 1912 SpA" from "Calcio Monza SpA". Under new ownership, Daldosso was released.

Voghera and Montichiari
Daldosso joined Serie D club Voghera in 2004 and played for the team in 2 seasons. In 2006, he was signed by Montichiari, returning to professional football after 2 years in non-(fully) professional level. Yet, he played only 18 games for Montichiari. Montichiari relegated back to Serie D in June 2007 after losing the additional "play-out" games.

Tritium
Daldosso without a club for a season, and in 2008 joined Serie D club Tritium. He won promotion back to Lega Pro Seconda Divisione in 2010, and promoted to 2011–12 Lega Pro Prima Divisione in the next year. He played at least 27 games per season for the Lombard club. He was released again in 2012.

Serie D return
In 2012, he was signed by Sambonifacese of Serie D.

Retirement
After two seasons with Peschiera Calcio, where he also had functioned as an athletic coach, 37-year old Daldosso retired in the summer 2020.

International career

Representative teams
Daldosso represented Serie C2 group A in 2004 Serie C Quadrangular Tournament. In 2007, he received a call-up to Italy Universiade team for a training match. In that match he was a substitute.

Italy youth teams
Daldosso also received call-up from the Italy U17 team on 14 June 2001 (after 2001 it was called the Italy U18 team), at that time a feeder team to prepare for the 2001–2002 UEFA European Under-19 Football Championship. However, he did not play that match.

Honours
Tritium
 Serie D (Group B): 2009–10
 Lega Pro Seconda Divisione (Group A): 2010–11
 Supercoppa di Lega di Seconda Divisione: 2011

References

External links
 AIC profile (data by football.it) 
 Fullsoccer profile 
 

Italian footballers
A.C. Monza players
Parma Calcio 1913 players
U.S. Alessandria Calcio 1912 players
A.C. Montichiari players
Tritium Calcio 1908 players
A.C. Sambonifacese players
U.S. Pergolettese 1932 players
Serie B players
Serie C players
Serie D players
Promozione players
Association football midfielders
Footballers from Milan
1983 births
Living people